Schjelderup is a surname. Notable people with the surname include:

Andreas Schjelderup (born 2004), Norwegian footballer
Ferdinand Schjelderup (1886–1955), Norwegian mountaineer, Supreme Court Justice and resistance member during the German occupation of Norway
Gerhard Schjelderup (1859-1933), Norwegian composer
Gunnar Schjelderup (1895–1972), Norwegian businessperson
Guttorm Schjelderup (born 1961), Norwegian economist
Harald K. Schjelderup (1895–1974), Norwegian physicist, philosopher and psychologist
Ingrid Schjelderup (disambiguation), several people
John Schjelderup Giæver (1901–1970), Norwegian author and polar researcher
Kristian Vilhelm Koren Schjelderup, Jr. (1894–1980), Norwegian bishop, son of Kristian Vilhelm Koren Schjelderup, Sr.
Kristian Vilhelm Koren Schjelderup, Sr. (1853–1913), Norwegian bishop, father of Kristian Vilhelm Koren Schjelderup, Jr.
Melchior Schjelderup Olsson Fuhr (1790–1869), Norwegian politician
Mon Schjelderup (1870–1934), Norwegian composer and pianist
Thorleif Frederik Schjelderup (1859–1931), Norwegian businessperson
Thorleif Schjelderup (1920–2006), Norwegian author and in the 1940s and 1950s one of Norway's best ski jumpers
Thorleif Schjelderup-Ebbe (1894–1982), Norwegian zoologist who described the pecking order of hens